Lillian Louise DeBaptiste (born November 15, 1951) is an American politician and funeral director. A Democrat, she is currently serving as Mayor of West Chester, the seat of Chester County, Pennsylvania. She is the borough's first black female mayor.

Early life and education 
DeBaptiste graduated from both Henderson High School and West Chester University in psychology.

Professional career 
DeBaptiste has been a funeral director at her family's funeral home, DeBaptiste Funeral Homes, since 1973. The business has a location in West Chester and another in Bryn Mawr. She runs a banquet hall as well. Called Milestone Events, it is located next door to their West Chester funeral home.

Political career 
On February 7, 2021, DeBaptiste announced her candidacy for Mayor of West Chester. She won the Democratic primary, defeating the incumbent interim mayor Jordan Norley and a third candidate, Kyle Hudson. DeBaptiste went on to win the general election in November and became the borough's first black female mayor on January 3, 2022.

DeBaptiste endorsed Malcolm Kenyatta for the 2022 Pennsylvania Senate race.

DeBaptiste announced that she would co-sponsor West Chester's first annual Porchfest, along with the West Chester Green Team. It was held on May 21, 2022.

She also continued the Police Department Diversity Task Force, a borough committee started by her predecessor that hopes to raise trust in the West Chester Police Department by making it more ethnically diverse.

Electoral history 
Mayor of West Chester, PA, 2021

Personal life 
DeBaptiste is married to Thomas D. Lambert Sr. The couple lives in West Chester. They have five children and four grandchildren together. DeBaptiste is the daughter of former mayor Clifford DeBaptiste, who served as the borough's first black mayor from 1994 to 2002 as a Republican. Active in her community, DeBaptiste has worked with the Charles A. Melton Arts & Education Center, the Chester County Community Foundation, and her local Planned Parenthood branch.

References 

Living people
Women mayors of places in Pennsylvania
Pennsylvania Democrats
American funeral directors
West Chester University alumni

1951 births
African-American women mayors
African-American mayors in Pennsylvania
21st-century American women politicians
21st-century African-American politicians
21st-century American politicians
People from West Chester, Pennsylvania
Mayors of West Chester, Pennsylvania